The Farallon Islands, or Farallones (from the Spanish farallón meaning "pillar" or "sea cliff"), are a group of islands and sea stacks in the Gulf of the Farallones, off the coast of San Francisco, California, United States. The islands are also sometimes referred to by mariners as the Devil's Teeth Islands, in reference to the many treacherous underwater shoals in their vicinity. The islands are part of the City and County of San Francisco. The only inhabited portion of the islands is on Southeast Farallon Island (SEFI), where researchers from Point Blue Conservation Science and the U.S. Fish and Wildlife Service stay. The islands are closed to the public.

The Farallon Islands National Wildlife Refuge is one of 63 national wildlife refuges that have congressionally designated wilderness status. Additionally, waters surrounding the islands are protected as part of the Greater Farallones National Marine Sanctuary.

History

The islands were long known by the name Islands of the Dead to the Native Americans who lived in the Bay Area prior to the arrival of Europeans, but they are not thought to have traveled to them, either for practical reasons (the voyage and landing would be difficult and dangerous) or because of spiritual beliefs (the islands were believed to be an abode of the spirits of the dead).

The first Europeans to see these islands were most probably the members of the Juan Cabrillo expedition of 1542 which sailed as far north as Point Reyes, but no source record of the Cabrillo expedition's actual sighting of these islands has survived. The first European to create a record of the islands that has survived was the English privateer and explorer Sir Francis Drake, on July 24, 1579. On that day, Drake landed on the islands to collect seal meat and bird eggs for his ship. He named them the Islands of Saint James because the day after his arrival was the feast day of St James the Great. The name of St James is now applied to only one of the rocky islets of the North Farallons.

The islands were apparently first given their names of the “Farallones” (literally, “cliffs”) by Friar Antonio de la Ascencion, aboard the Spanish explorer Sebastián Vizcaíno's 1603 expedition. It is believed that probably for the next two centuries after their discovery, their rather ominous appearance, lying just off the entrance to San Francisco Bay, most likely caused the earlier mariners to prefer to skirt far to the west and offshore from the entrance to the bay, thus leading to the much later discovery of the San Francisco Bay by land over two centuries after the 1542 discovery of the islands. In 1769, the bay inlet was finally discovered soon after an overland sighting of the bay was made from what is now the Pacifica area.

In the years following the discovery of the islands, during the maritime fur trade era, the islands were exploited by seal hunters, first from New England and later from Russia. The Russians maintained a sealing station in the Farallones from 1812 to 1840, taking 1,200 to 1,500 fur seals annually, though American ships had already exploited the islands. The Albatross, captained by Nathan Winship, and the O'Cain, captained by his brother Jonathan Winship, were the first American ships sent from Boston in 1809 to establish a settlement on the Columbia River. In 1810, they met with two other American ships at the Farallon Islands, the Mercury and the Isabella, and at least 30,000 seal skins were taken. By 1818, the seals diminished rapidly until only about 500 could be taken annually and within the next few years, the fur seal was extirpated from the islands. Whether the northern fur seal or the Guadalupe fur seal were the islands' native fur seal is unknown, although the northern fur seal is the species that began to recolonize the islands in 1996.

On July 17, 1827,  French sea captain Auguste Duhaut-Cilly sailed by the southernmost Farallon Island and counted the "crude dwellings of about a hundred Kodiaks stationed there by the Russians of Bodega...the Kodiaks, in their light boats, slip into San Francisco Bay by night, moving along the coast opposite the fort, and once inside this great basin, they station themselves temporarily on some of the inner islands, from where they catch the sea otter without hindrance."

After Alta California was ceded by Mexico to the United States in 1848 with the Treaty of Guadalupe Hidalgo, the islands' environment became linked to the growth of the city of San Francisco. Beginning in 1853, a lighthouse was constructed on SEFI. As the city grew, the seabird colonies came under severe threat as eggs were collected in the millions for San Francisco markets. The trade, which in its heyday could yield 500,000 eggs a month, was the source of conflict between the egg-collecting companies and the lighthouse keepers. This conflict turned violent in a confrontation between rival companies in 1863. The clash between two rival companies, known as the Egg War, left two men dead and marked the end of private companies on the islands, although the lighthouse keepers continued egging.. 

From 1902 to 1913, the former U.S. Weather Bureau maintained a weather station on the southeast island, which was connected with the mainland by cable. The results of the meteorological study were later published in a book on California's climate. Years later, the National Weather Service provided some weather observations from the lighthouse on its local radio station.

The islands have also been mentioned in connection with the schooner Malahat as one possible site for Rum Row during Prohibition. 

A high-frequency direction finding (HFDF) station was established here by the Navy during World War II. These radio intercept sites along the coast could track Japanese warships and merchant marine vessels as far away as the Western Pacific.  The other stations  in California were at Point Arguello, Point Saint George, and San Diego. Bainbridge Island, Washington also hosted a station. The United States Coast Guard maintained a staffed lighthouse until 1972, when it was automated.

Nuclear waste dump

From 1946 to 1970, the sea around the Farallones was used as a dump site for radioactive waste under the authority of the Atomic Energy Commission at a site known as the Farallon Island Nuclear Waste Dump. Most of the dumping took place before 1960, and all dumping of radioactive wastes by the United States was terminated in 1970. By then, 47,500 containers (55-gallon steel drums) had been dumped in the vicinity, with a total estimated radioactive activity of 14,500 Ci. The materials dumped were mostly laboratory materials containing traces of contamination. By 1980, most of the radiation had decayed.

Waste containers were shipped to Hunters Point Shipyard, then loaded onto barges for transportation to the Farallones. Containers were weighted with concrete. Those that floated were sometimes shot with rifles to sink them.

In January 1951, the highly radioactive hull of USS Independence, which was used in Operation Crossroads nuclear weapons testing and then loaded with barrels of radioactive waste, was scuttled in the area. Its wreck was rediscovered in 2015.

The exact current location of the containers and the potential hazard the containers pose to the environment are unknown. According to the EPA, attempts to remove the barrels would likely produce greater risk than leaving them undisturbed.

Shipwrecks
The islands are the site of many shipwrecks. The liberty ship SS Henry Bergh, a converted troop carrier, hit West End in 1944 (all hands were saved). The USS Conestoga, a US Navy tugboat that disappeared with its 56 crew members in 1921, was found in 2009 and positively identified in 2016. (The Conestoga had sailed from nearby San Francisco, but the waters of the Farallones were never searched because the vessel was assumed to have traveled far out into the Pacific.) 

On the morning of August 5, 1941, a United States Coast Guard Douglas Dolphin, V-126, likely struck a rock pinnacle on the southeast Farallon island, causing the aircraft to burst into flames. All 3 crewmen aboard were killed. 

Computer scientist Jim Gray was lost at sea after setting out on a solo sailing trip from San Francisco to the Farallones on January 28, 2007. Despite an unusually thorough search, neither his body nor his boat was ever found. On April 14, 2012, the sailing yacht Low Speed Chase capsized during a race at Maintop Island, killing 5 of the 8 crew aboard.

Swimming records
Three people successfully swam from the Farallones to the Golden Gate, with two more swimming to points north of the gate. The first, Ted Erikson, made the swim in September 1967, with the second, Joseph Locke, swimming to the Golden Gate on July 12, 2014, in 14 hours. The third person, and the first woman to complete the distance, Kimberley Chambers, made it in just over 17 hours on August 7, 2015.

Protected area
The collecting of eggs along with the threat of oil spills from San Francisco's shipping lanes, prompted President Theodore Roosevelt to sign Executive Order No. 1043 in 1909, creating the Farallon Reservation to protect the chain's northern islands. This was expanded to the other islands in 1969 when it became a national wildlife refuge. In 1981, Congress designated the Gulf of the Farallones National Marine Sanctuary, which spanned 1,279 square miles (3,313 square kilometers; 966 square nautical miles) of water surrounding the islands. This sanctuary protected open ocean, nearshore tidal flats, rocky intertidal areas, estuarine wetlands, subtidal reefs, and coastal beaches within its boundaries. In 2015, the sanctuary was enlarged north and west of the original boundary, partially surrounding Cordell Bank National Marine Sanctuary, to encompass 3,295 square miles (8,534 square kilometers; 2,488 square nautical miles), and the name was changed to Greater Farallones National Marine Sanctuary. The sanctuary is contiguous with both the Cordell Bank sanctuary and another sanctuary to the south, Monterey Bay National Marine Sanctuary. The islands are managed by the United States Fish and Wildlife Service, in conjunction with the Marin-based Point Blue Conservation Science (formerly Point Reyes Bird Observatory). The islands are currently the subject of long term ecological research. The Farallones are closed to the public, although birders and wildlife enthusiasts can approach them on whale watching boats and the sail-training vessel Seaward out of Sausalito.

Geology
The Farallon Islands are outcroppings of the Salinian Block, a vast geologic province of granitic continental crust sharing its origins with the core of the Sierra Nevada Mountains. The block was rifted off far to the south of its present position and moved north with the Pacific Plate on which the islands rest. Other nearby examples of the Salinian Block include the Point Reyes Peninsula and Bodega Head. The San Andreas Fault, marking a boundary zone between the Pacific and North American Plates, passes a few miles east of the islands.

The ancient Farallon Plate is named after the islands.

Geography

Overview
The islands were initially exploited for bird eggs and fur seal skins, then used as a lighthouse station and a radio station. They have been protected in the Farallon Islands National Wildlife Refuge, first established in 1909 with the Southeast Farallons added in 1969, and contain the largest seabird colony in the U.S. outside of Alaska and Hawaii. The islands are part of the City and County of San Francisco, in Supervisorial District 4, mainly covering The Sunset District.
They were formerly part of District 1 (Northwest), also called The Richmond District.

South Farallon Islands

The peak, Tower Hill (actually a double peak consisting of Lighthouse Hill and Little Lighthouse Hill), is the location of a lighthouse, the Farallon Island Light. The large flat area in the southeast of the island is called Marine Terrace.
 Maintop Island (West End) is immediately to the west of SEFI, separated by a narrow impassable gorge, The Jordan (Jordan Channel), which connects Mirounga Bay in the south to Maintop Bay in the north. The Great West Arch, or Aulon Arch, is a rock formation in the west of the island, and Indian Head is in the south.
 The Drunk Uncle Islets are a group of small rocks just northwest of Maintop Island.
They are barely separated by a narrow gorge. Great Arch Rock is not to be confused with Great West Arch, a rock formation in the west of Maintop Island.
Southwest of Aulon Island, Great Arch Rock and Sugarloaf Island, and in the northeast of SEFI, is protected Fisherman Bay.
 Hurst Shoal is located about one kilometer southeast of the southeastern corner of SEFI.

Middle Farallon Island
This island is informally known as "the pimple."

North Farallon Islands

North Farallon Islands, about 7 km further northwest, consist of two clusters of bare precipitous islets and rocks 31 to 85 meters high, with an aggregate area of 28,270 m2
 North Farallon Island, 31 meters high, about 150 meters long north-south, 9,260 m2
 Island of St. James, 47 meters high, about 125 meters in diameter, 12,380 m2
 unnamed rock, about 85 meters in diameter, and 5,640 m2 in area
 four smaller unnamed rocks, diameter 20 meters and less
Some of those unnamed rocks, however, have Spanish names, such as Piedra Guadalupe, Peñasco Quebrado and Farallón Vizcaíno.

Fanny Shoal
5 km WNW of the North Farallones is Fanny Shoal, a bank 3 km in extent, with depth less than 55 meters, marking the northernmost and westernmost feature of the group, albeit entirely submerged.
There is a lighted bell buoy about 1 km west of Noonday Rock. Noonday Rock, formerly known as Fanny Rock, derives its name from that of the clipper ship that struck it on January 1, 1863, and sank within one hour.

Banks northwest of Fanny Shoal
The banks northwest of Fanny Shoal are not considered part of the Farallon Islands anymore, and they are outside of U.S. territorial waters. About 25 km northwest of Fanny Shoal is Cordell Bank, a significant marine habitat. About halfway between Fanny Shoal and Cordell Bank is Rittenburg Bank, with depths of less than 80 meters.

Flora and fauna

Seabirds
The Farallon Islands are an important reserve protecting a huge seabird colony. The islands' position in the highly productive California Current and eastern Pacific upwelling region, as well as the absence of other large islands that would provide suitable nesting grounds, result in a seabird population of over 250,000. Twelve species of seabird and shorebird nest on the islands; western gull, Brandt's cormorant, pelagic cormorant, double-crested cormorant, pigeon guillemot, common murre, Cassin's auklet, tufted puffin, black oystercatcher, rhinoceros auklet, ashy storm-petrel, and Leach's storm-petrel. Since the islands were protected, common murres, which once numbered nearly 500,000 pairs but suffered from the egg collecting, oil spills and other disturbances that had greatly reduced their numbers, recovered and climbed from 6,000 birds to 160,000. Additionally, since protection, the locally extinct rhinoceros auklet has begun to breed on the islands again. The island has the world's largest colonies of western gulls and ashy storm petrels, the latter species being considered endangered and a conservation priority. The island also is the wintering ground of several species of migrants, and regularly attracts vagrant birds (about 430 species of bird have been recorded on or around the island).

Seals
 
Five species of pinniped come to shore on the islands, and in some cases breed. These are the northern elephant seal, harbor seal, Steller's sea lion, California sea lion, and the northern fur seal (the last of which, like the rhinoceros auklet, began to return to the island again after protection).

Sealers took 150,000 northern fur seals (Callorhinus ursinus) from the Farallons between 1810 and 1813, followed by Russian fur hunters who lived on the Farallons and extirpated the pinnipeds from the islands. In 1996 West End Island became the fourth American northern fur seal rookery when a pup was born. The recolonizers bore tags from San Miguel Island in the Channel Islands, which had been itself recolonized in 1968. By 2006, nearly 100 pups were born. The fur seals are aggressive and have displaced larger sea lions from their territory. The high count for 2011 was 476 individuals, a 69 percent increase from the year before. By 2016, the pup count alone was 1,126, reflecting a 21% average (but highly variable) annual increase in new pups over the 21 years since recolonization. If the South Farallon Islands population reaches its estimated historical size of 100,000 individuals, it could account for approximately one-fifth of the world's northern fur seal population.

Northern elephant seals (Mirounga angustirostris) recolonized the refuge in 1959 with a confirmed pup in 1972. The elephant seal rookery on Southeast Farallon has probably reached carrying capacity.

Whales
Several species of cetaceans are found near the Farallon Islands, most frequently gray whales, blue whales, and humpback whales. Blue whales and humpback whales are most frequently found near the islands in the summer and fall, when strong upwelling may support a rich pelagic food web. Orca whales are also found around the islands. Gray whales are reliably found near the Farallones during their spring migration north and the fall and winter migration south. Some gray whales may also be found during the summer, when a few whales skip the trip north to Alaska and spend the summer months off the coast of Canada and the continental United States.

In December 2005 one humpback was rescued from netting entanglement east of the Farallones by staff of The Marine Mammal Center. The last sighting of another humpback, Humphrey, was near the Farallones in 1991. The islands are in the Gulf of the Farallones National Marine Sanctuary, which protects the feeding grounds of the wildlife of the refuge.

Sharks
The elephant seal population attracts a population of great white sharks to the islands. In 1970 Farallon biologists witnessed their first shark attack, on a Steller's sea lion. During the next fifteen years, more than one hundred attacks on seals and sea lions were observed at close range. By the year 2000, biologists were logging almost eighty attacks in a single season.

While the males return annually, the females return only every other year, often with fresh, deep bites around their heads. The seasonal shark population at the Farallones is unclear, with estimates from thirty to one hundred. The Farallones are unique in the size of the great whites that are attracted. (For comparison, the largest accurately measured great white shark was a female caught in August 1988 at Prince Edward Island off the North Atlantic coast and measured .) A killer whale was recorded killing a great white near the Farallones in 1997. Over the decades of study, many of the individual white sharks visiting the Farallones have been nicknamed, often based on their scars and appearances, such as Gouge, The Hunchback, The Jester, and Stumpy. Stumpy, an 18-foot female great white, in particular was well known for her appearance in the BBC documentary "Great White Shark" narrated by David Attenborough and stock footage of her attacks on decoys is often utilized in more recent documentaries, and another example, Tom Johnson, a 16-foot male white shark that was featured in an episode of the 2012 season of Shark Week called "Great White Highway," is believed to be the oldest living white shark so far documented returning to the Farallones, estimated at around 25–30 years old.

Some individual sharks have been tagged and found to roam the Pacific as far as Hawaii and Guadalupe Island off Baja California, returning regularly to the Farallones every year in the autumn. The peak of activity at this location is from mid-April to Mid-July, but some sharks spend up to eight months of the year there. This island has many migratory sharks return to its waters every year.

Rodents
The islands have tens of thousands of invasive house mice that are wreaking havoc on the native ecosystem. An average of 500 Eurasian house mice occupy each of its , with an approximate total population of 60,000.

In popular culture
The Farallon Islands and their role in the Egg War of the Gold Rush era are documented in the 2017 The Kitchen Sisters Present podcast episode "Egg Wars", in the 2019 The Dollop podcast episode 407 "The Egg Wars", and in the 2020 Behind the Bastards podcast episode "The War of the Eggs".

See also

 Channel Islands of California

References

Sources 
  WP article

External links

 Farallon Islands National Wildlife Refuge USFWS
 Satellite map and NOAA Chart of Farallon Islands on BlooSee
 Farallon Islands San Francisco Chronicle
 Farallon Islands  at the Center for Land use Interpretation
 Article about nuclear waste at the Farallons
 farallones.org
 Area figures from Bureau of the Census
 The Farallon Blog Weblog of the field biologists on the Farallon Islands
 Aerial photography of the Farallones
 Live streaming video from the South East Farallon Island California Academy of Sciences
 Farallon Islands Foundation a SF Bay Area non-profit wildlife conservation group

Islands of San Francisco
Islands of Northern California
Islands of the San Francisco Bay Area
National Register of Historic Places in San Francisco
National Wildlife Refuges in California
Seabird colonies
Protected areas of San Francisco
Natural history of San Francisco
Stacks of the United States
Pacific islands of California